Ken Morton (born 19 May 1947) is an English former professional footballer who played as a left winger. Morton made a total of 14 appearances in the Football League, scoring two goals. After retiring as a player, Morton later became active as a coach.

Career

Playing career
Born in Copley, Morton began his career with Manchester United, but left without making a senior appearance, and later played for a number of teams in both the Football League and Non-League football, including York City, Blackpool, Fleetwood, Darlington and Stockton.

Coaching career
After retiring as a player, Morton later became active as a coach in Australia, Malaysia, the Maldives, Vietnam and Ethiopia, and is currently part of the Tasmanian A-League Bid. He is the current coach of South Hobart Football Club.

References

1947 births
Living people
English footballers
Manchester United F.C. players
York City F.C. players
Blackpool F.C. players
Fleetwood Town F.C. players
Darlington F.C. players
Stockton F.C. players
English Football League players
Association football midfielders